The 1983 Soviet Cup Final was a football match that took place at the Lenin's Central Stadium, Moscow on May 8, 1983. The match was the 42nd Soviet Cup Final and it was contested by FC Shakhtar Donetsk and FC Metalist Kharkiv. The Soviet Cup winner Shakhter won the cup for the fourth time. The last year defending holders Dinamo Kiev were eliminated in the quarterfinals of the competition by Zenit Leningrad.

Road to Moscow 
All sixteen Soviet Top League clubs did not have to go through qualification to get into the competition, so Shakhter and Metallist both qualified for the competition automatically.

Note: In all results below, the score of the finalist is given first (H: home; A: away).

Previous Encounters

Match details

MATCH OFFICIALS 
Assistant referees:
 Yu.Savchenko (Moscow)
 K.Doronin (Moscow)
Fourth official: 

MATCH RULES
90 minutes.
30 minutes of extra-time if necessary.
Penalty shoot-out if scores still level.
Seven named substitutes
Maximum of 3 substitutions.

See also
 1983 Soviet Top League
 1983 Soviet First League
 1983 Soviet Second League

References

External links 
The competition calendar
1983. Украинский финал Кубка СССР «Шахтер» - «Металлист», старт «Днепра» в чемпионате. ua.tribuna.com
Шахтер (Донецк) - Металлист (Харьков). metallurg.pp.ua
И вновь о том, как Металлист в 1983 заставили сдать финал Кубка СССР Шахтёру. www.sports.ru

1983
Cup Final
Soviet Cup Final
Soviet Cup Final 1983
Soviet Cup Final 1983
June 1983 sports events in Europe
1983 in Moscow